Suzanne Desprès (16 December 1875 – 1 July 1951) was a French actress who was born at Verdun, Meuse and trained at the Paris Conservatoire, where in 1897 she obtained the first prize for comedy, and the second for tragedy.

She then became associated with, and subsequently married, Lugné-Poe, the actor-manager, who had founded a new school of modern drama at the Théâtre de l'Œuvre. She achieved marked success in several of his plays there.

In succeeding years she played at the Gymnase and at the Porte Saint-Martin, and in 1902 made her debut at the Comédie-Française, appearing in Phèdre and other important parts.

Selected filmography
 The Bread Peddler (1923)
 Maria Chapdelaine (1934)
 The Woman Thief (1938)
 The Pretty Miller Girl (1949)

References

External links

1875 births
1951 deaths
People from Verdun
French stage actresses
French silent film actresses
20th-century French actresses
Troupe of the Comédie-Française